One Dollar is an American mystery thriller drama streaming television series created by Jason Mosberg that premiered on August 30, 2018 on CBS All Access. The series centers on the denizens of a small rust belt community and shifts perspective from person to person as a dollar bill changes hands. The ensemble cast consists of John Carroll Lynch, Nathaniel Martello-White, Philip Ettinger, Christopher Denham, Kirrilee Berger, Joshua Bitton, Níkẹ Uche Kadri, Gracie Lawrence, and Hamilton Clancy. On December 12, 2018, it was announced that the series had been canceled after one season.

Premise
One Dollar is set in "a small rustbelt town in post-recession America, where a one-dollar bill changing hands connects a group of characters involved in a shocking multiple murder. The path of the dollar bill, and point of view in each episode, paints a picture of a modern American town with deep class and cultural divides that spill out into the open as the town's secrets get revealed."

Cast and characters

Main

 John Carroll Lynch as Bud Carl
 Nathaniel Martello-White as Jake Noveer
 Philip Ettinger as Garrett Drimmer
 Christopher Denham as Peter Trask
 Kirrilee Berger as Danielle "Dannie" Furlbee
 Joshua Bitton as Chewy
 Níkẹ Uche Kadri as Rook
 Gracie Lawrence as Julie Gardner
 Hamilton Clancy as Tom

Recurring

 Ashlie Atkinson as Terri Mitchell
 Greg Germann as Wilson Furlbee
 Erik LaRay Harvey as Dante
 Josh Salatin as Tyler Bennett
 Adelyn and Emerson Bowman as Carrie Drimmer
 Lucy Owen as Sandy Furlbee
 Gregory Johnstone as Jonno
 Margot Bingham as Cass
 Sturgill Simpson as Ken Fry
 Manuel Herrera as Michael Goodman
 Medusa as Reverend Etta Whitney
 Ida Chapman as Cooper Shaw
 Wayne Duvall as Benjamin Walsh
 Nicolas Hardin as Ricky Mitchell
 Kristy Nolen as Lori Brenneman
 Jeb Kreager as Officer Martin Huddle
 Leslie Odom Jr. as Randall Abatsy
 Aleksa Palladino as Chelsea Wyler
 Deirdre O'Connell as Carol
 Che Tafari as Markell Jenkins
 James McMenamin as Rick
 Nancy McNulty as Mary Shaw 
 Jeff Perry as Charles Wyler
 Meredith Holzman
 Mary MacDonald Kerr as Janet Miller
 Lindsay Burdge as Jenny Ludlow
 Gia Crovatin
 Jacob Knoll as Dan Fry
 Kate Nowlin as Cathy
 Timothy Busfield as Uncle Rich
 Pernell Walker as Laila
 Jayden Marine as Cesar
 David Drumm as Old Man
 Nathan Hollabaugh as Adam
 Maya Sayre as Heidi
 Rachel McKeon as Robyn

Guest

 Timothy Busfield as Uncle Rich ("Chelsea Wyler")
 Lindsay Burdge as Jenny Ludlow ("Jenny Ludlow")
 Annie Golden ("Jenny Ludlow")
 Darius Kaleb as Jeremy ("Jenny Ludlow")
 Denise Burse ("Wilson Furlbee")
 Cotter Smith as Mayor Britt ("Wilson Furlbee")
 Susan Blommaert ("Cooper Shaw")

Episodes

Production

Development
On August 1, 2017, it was announced that CBS All Access had given the production, then titled $1, a series order. The series was created by Jason Mosberg and was set to be executive produced by Matt DeRoss, Alexandre Dauman, and Craig Zobel, who was also expected to direct. Production companies involved with the series were slated to include CBS Television Studios and Anonymous Content. On July 2, 2018, it was announced that the series had been retitled One Dollar and that it would premiere on August 30, 2018. On December 12, 2018, it was announced that CBS All Access had canceled the series.

Casting
On March 6, 2018, it was announced that John Carroll Lynch, Philip Ettinger, Chris Denham, Nathaniel Martello-White, Kirrilee Berger, and Gracie Lawrence had joined the main cast as series regulars and that Jeff Perry, Leslie Odom Jr., and Sturgill Simpson were cast in recurring roles. Later that month, the cast was rounded out with the addition of  Nike Kadri, Joshua Bitton, and Hamilton Clancy as series regulars and Ashlie Atkinson as a recurring guest star. On April 10, 2018, it was announced that Aleksa Palladino had joined the cast in a recurring capacity.

Filming
Principal photography for the first season began on March 27, 2018 in Pittsburgh, Pennsylvania.

Release
On July 2, 2018, a promotional poster for the series was released. On August 5, 2018, a teaser trailer for the series was released. On August 13, 2018, the official trailer was released.

Reception
The series has been met with a generally positive response from critics upon its premiere. On the review aggregation website Rotten Tomatoes, the series holds an 80% approval rating, with an average rating of 6 out of 10 based on 10 reviews. Metacritic, which uses a weighted average, assigned the series a score of 64 out of 100 based on 6 critics, indicating "generally favorable reviews."

In a positive review, Los Angeles Timess Robert Lloyd praised the series saying, "The excellence of the acting and the admirable, one might almost say English naturalism of the production balance the sometimes improbable, even implausible action and the occasional sacrifice of sense to drama; it is true that in life, people do not act sensibly, but fictional characters should be held to a higher standard of consistency. Still, the writing gives the actors a lot to play with." In a more mixed critique, TV Guides Liam Mathews discussed the show's various sub-plots saying, "They writers are much more interested in the vignettes that build out the town...These smaller side stories give the show an indie movie-like texture about people trying to make it in America. They're sort of like short films within the bigger show, and they contain much of the show's best writing and acting. They would be better if they didn't have the unnecessary dollar bill gimmick connecting them all, but it's not that distracting." In an outright negative assessment, The Hollywood Reporters Tim Goodman criticized the series saying, "There's not enough good writing here, not enough motivation to follow characters that are either intentionally half-baked or are merely uninteresting. Characters have quirks, but the quirks prove there's not much else there. Smart people eventually do exceptionally dumb things."

References

External links

2010s American drama television series
2018 American television series debuts
2018 American television series endings
English-language television shows
Paramount+ original programming
Television series by Anonymous Content
Television series by CBS Studios
Mystery drama web series
Thriller web series
Television shows filmed in Pittsburgh